Marcus Bosley (10 August 1897 – 12 June 1982) was an Australian cricketer. He played one first-class match for New South Wales in 1924/25.

See also
 List of New South Wales representative cricketers

References

External links
 

1897 births
1982 deaths
Australian cricketers
New South Wales cricketers
Cricketers from Sydney